Ignatius is a male given name and a surname. Notable people with the name include:

Given name

Religious 
 Ignatius of Antioch (35–108), saint and martyr, Apostolic Father, early Christian bishop
 Ignatius of Constantinople (797–877), Catholic and Eastern Orthodox saint, Patriarch of Constantinople
 Ignatios the Deacon (780/790 – after 845), Byzantine bishop and writer
 Ignatius, Primate of Bulgaria in 1272–1277
 Ignatius Brianchaninov (1807–1867), Russian Orthodox saint, bishop and ascetical writer
 Ignatius of Jesus (1596–1667), Italian Catholic missionary friar
 Ignatius of Laconi (1701–1781), Italian Catholic saint
 Ignatius of Loyola (1491–1556), Basque Catholic saint and founder of the Society of Jesus
 Ignatius of Moscow (1540–1620), Russian Orthodox Patriarch
 Ignatius Moses I Daoud (or Moussa Daoud) (1930–2012), Syrian Catholic Patriarch
 Ignatius Zakka I Iwas (born 1933), Syriac Orthodox Patriarch
 Ignatius III Atiyah, 17th-century Melkite Greek Catholic Patriarch of Antioch
 Ignatius III David, 13th-century Syriac Orthodox Church Patriarch
 Ignatius IV Sarrouf (1742–1812), Melkite Greek Catholic Patriarch of Antioch
 Ignatius IV (Hazim) of Antioch (1921–2012), Greek Orthodox Patriarch of Antioch 
 Ignatius V Qattan (1756–1833), Melkite Greek Catholic Patriarch of Antioch 
 First name of all the Syrian Catholic Patriarchs of Antioch since the 15th century
 Ignatius Suharyo Hardjoatmodjo (born 1950), Indonesian prelate and current archbishop of Jakarta
 Ignatius Phakoe (1927–1989), Lesotho Roman Catholic bishop

Other 
 Ignatius Kutu Acheampong (1931–1979), Ghanaian military ruler
 Ignatius Bernstein (1846–1900), Russian railroad engineer
 Ignatius Bonomi (1787–1870), British architect
 Ignatius Valentine Chirol (1852–1929), British writer and diplomat
 Ignatius Chombo (born 1952), Zimbabwean politician
 Ignatius L. Donnelly (1831–1901), American politician and writer
 Arthur Ignatius Conan Doyle (1859–1930), British writer and physician
 Ignatius Ganago (1999-), Cameroonian professional footballer
 Ignatius J. Galantin (1910–2004), American admiral
 Ignatius Joseph Kasimo Hendrowahyono (1900–1986), Indonesian politician
 Ignatius Jones (born 1957), Australian singer and producer
 Ignatius K. Musaazi (1905–1990), Ugandan politician
 Ignatius O'Brien, 1st Baron Shandon (1857–1930), Irish lawyer
 Igantius Xavier Pereira (1888–1951), Indian Tamil-Sri Lankan businessman and politician
 Ignatius Sancho (1729–1780), British writer
 Ignatius Scoles (1834–1896), British architect, priest and writer
 Ignatius Shixwameni (born 1966), Namibian politician
 Ignatius Zhuwakiyi (born 1969), Zimbabwean sculptor

Surname 
 Adi Ignatius (born 1959), American journalist
 David Ignatius (born 1950), American journalist and writer
 Hannes Ignatius (1871–1941), Finnish general
 Karl Ferdinand Ignatius (1837–1909), Finnish politician
 Paul Ignatius (born 1920), American administrator

Fictional characters 
 Ignatius Mortimer Meen, the villain in the 1995 video game I.M. Meen
 Ignatius J. Reilly, in A Confederacy of Dunces by John Kennedy Toole
 Ignatius Gallaher, in A Little Cloud by James Joyce
 Ignatius Martin Perrish, in Horns by Joe Hill
 Horatio Thelonious Ignacious Crustaceous Sebastian, in Disney’s The Little Mermaid (1989 film) Ignatius, in Fire Emblem Fates''

See also 
 Ignat
 Ignaz
 Iggy
 Ignacio
 Ignazio
 Inácio
 Ignjat
 Inigo
 Ignatz and Ignaz
 3562 Ignatius, main-belt asteroid
 St. Ignatius (disambiguation)
 Żegota (disambiguation), Polish version of the name
 Vatroslav, Croatian cognate